The New Bridge is a bridge over the River Dodder in Dublin, Ireland. It is also known as Herbert's Bridge or Lansdowne Bridge. The bridge is part of Lansdowne Road.

History
It is not known when the New Bridge structure was erected. It does not appear on the 1837 map of Dublin.

References

Bridges in Dublin (city)